This is the List of municipalities in Bartın Province, Turkey .

References 

Geography of Bartın Province
Bartin